Hammerschmidt (from  "smith of hammers") is a German surname.

People
Andreas Hammerschmidt (1611–1675), German Bohemian composer
Carl Eduard Hammerschmidt (1800-1874), Austrian mineralogist 
Frank Hammerschmidt, clarinet maker
John Paul Hammerschmidt (1922-2015), American politician
Hildegard Hammerschmidt-Hummel (born 1944), German professor
Maren Hammerschmidt (born 1989), German biathlete

See also
Hammerschmidt (disambiguation)

German-language surnames
Occupational surnames